Charles Bochus (December 30, 1802 – January 10, 1878) was a merchant and political figure. He represented Prince Edward in the Legislative Assembly of Upper Canada from 1836 to 1841 as a Conservative member.

He was a captain in the militia and lived in Picton. He died there at the age of 75.

References 
Johnson, JK Becoming Prominent: Regional Leadership in Upper Canada, 1791-1841 (1989)  pp. 174

1802 births
1878 deaths
Members of the Legislative Assembly of Upper Canada
People from Prince Edward County, Ontario